A Few Dollars for Django is a 1966 Spaghetti Western film directed by León Klimovsky and Enzo G. Castellari and starring Anthony Steffen. Although credited only to León Klimovsky, A Few Dollars for Django was predominantly directed by an uncredited Enzo G. Castellari.

Plot
A bounty hunter named Regan wishes to settle down and begin a new life, maybe become sheriff, but a murder leads him in pursuit of bank robbers and lands him in a range war with farmers and cattlemen.

Cast 
 Anthony Steffen (as Antony Steffen) as Django Regan
 Frank Wolff as Jim Norton / Trevor Norton
 Gloria Osuna as Sally Norton
 Ennio Girolami (as Thomas Moore) as Sam Lister
 José Luis Lluch as Buck Dago
 Alfonso Rojas as Amos Brownsberg
 Sandalio Hernández as Smitty
 José Luis Lizalde (as Tomas Lizalde) as Judge's Assistant
 Ángel Ter as Judge
 Joaquín Parra	as Freeman

Release
A Few Dollars for Django was released in 1966. The film was released to television as A Few Dollars for Gypsy.

References

Sources

External links

1966 films
Films directed by León Klimovsky
Films directed by Enzo G. Castellari
Films scored by Carlo Savina
Spaghetti Western films
Spanish Western (genre) films
1966 Western (genre) films
Django films
Films shot in Almería
1960s Italian films